Paha Samath, interchangeably use as 5 Samath, is a 2017 Sri Lankan Sinhala children's film directed by Jayaprakash Sivagurunadan and produced by Hans Anton Vanstarex for New Imperial Talkies. It stars new coming child actors along with Dilhani Ekanayake and Uddika Premarathna. Music composed by Kapila Pugalaarchchi. The muhurath ceremony was held at the New Imperial Talkies

It is the 1291st Sri Lankan film in the Sinhala cinema. The film received mostly positive reviews from critics. Child artist Amiru Koralage won a merit award at the 2018 Sarasaviya Awards.

Plot
The film discuss about the modern life of children who struggle to pass grade 5 scholarship and the pressure exerted by parents on them. The film emphasize well to express what happened to the bond with nature and outdoor sports due to whole day studies and tuition classes.

Cast
 Uddika Premarathna as Samath's father
 Dilhani Ekanayake as Samath's mother
 Shyam Fernando as Doctor Meegaspe
 Semini Iddamalgoda as Mrs. Meegaspe
 Priyantha Seneviratne as Bus conductor
 Giriraj Kaushalya as Bus driver
 Dayadeva Edirisinghe as Village principal
 Saddha Mangala Suriyabandara as Town school's principal
 Wageesha Salgadu as Samath's sister
 Iranganie Serasinghe as Vinura's granny
 Malkanthi Jayasinghe as Village school class teacher
 Asha Edirisinghe as Town school's class teacher
 Ranjan Sooriyakumara as News reader
 Upatissa Balasuriya as Hostel warden
 Sarath Chandrasiri as Village farmer
 Rohan Wijethunga as Bus passenger
 Udari Warnakulasooriya in cameo role

Child cast
 Amiru Koralage as Samath Peragammana
 Sharad Chanduma as Vinura Meegaspe
 Sejan Hansana as Thusil
 Kivindi Kasundara as Sayani
 Yovindu Ethugala
 Obhashitha Kangarage

Songs
The film contains four songs.

References

2010s Sinhala-language films
2017 films